Mount Mueller is a mountain of the Great Dividing Range, located in Victoria, Australia.

Location
The mountain itself is one of several peaks on the Baw Baw Plateau, a long plateau tending north-east. Other peaks on the plateau include Mount Baw Baw, Mount Whitelaw, Mount St Phillack (the highest), Mount Tyers, Mount Kernot and Mount St Gwinear. The plateau itself is isolated from most of Victoria's high country by the Thomson and Aberfeldy rivers and tributaries of the La Trobe River, including the Tanjil and Tyers rivers to the south.

Geology and biology
The Baw Baw massif consists of a late Devonian granodiorite pluton. There is relatively little relief on the plateau itself, the highest point (Mount St. Phillack) reaching . The lower slopes of the plateau are covered in montane eucalypt forest and tall forest, and creek valleys have cool temperate rainforest of myrtle beech, Nothofagus cunninghamii. Above  snow gum woodland occurs. There is no alttudinal treeline limit; subalpine grasslands and shrublands occur in flat valley bottoms on the plateau as a result of cold-air drainage. Much of this subalpine zone is included in the  Baw Baw National Park. 

Snow covers the plateau from June to September.

See also

Alpine National Park
List of mountains in Victoria

References 

Mountains of Victoria (Australia)
Victorian Alps